Melissa Delgadillo (born May 23, 1982) is an American beauty queen, philanthropist, and socialite.  She is most known for winning the title of Miss Houston International 2011.

Pageantry

Early Pageantry Career 
Delgadillo got her start in pageantry at the age of 21 when she competed in her local college pageant, Miss BYU-Idaho.  She went on to compete in the Miss America System from there, placing third runner up at Miss San Francisco shortly after moving to California.

Miss Houston International 2011 
Delgadillo was crowned Miss Houston International in May 2010.  Winning a title in the fourth largest city in the United States put Delgadillo instantly into the spotlight. She spent her year serving the city of Houston and working with over 50 organizations. During Delgadillo's reign, she promoted Character Development and emphasized that educating youth is one of the greatest ways to impact society.

As Miss Houston International, Delgadillo made celebrity appearances at 65+ events, including: building a house on ABC's Extreme Makeover Home Edition, attending a live taping of ESPN's College Game Day and being part of the live audience for NBC's NFL Kick-off concert featuring Taylor Swift and Dave Mathews Band, CMT's Super Bowl Fan Jam featuring Faith Hill and The Pretenders, and NBC's America's Got Talent.

In March 2011 Delgadillo competed for Miss Texas International, where she placed top ten and won the Community Service Award for creating the greatest impact in a local community.

Preceding Delgadillo as Miss Houston International, was Ashley Smith, who went on to win the title of Miss Texas International 2010 and national title, Miss International 2010.

Titles 

 Miss Houston International 2011
 Miss City of Trees International 2009
 Miss Treasure Valley USA 2009
 Miss San Francisco International 2007
 Miss Northern California ATOC 2007
 Miss San Ramon American Queen 2007
 Miss Natural Beauty USA 2007

Philanthropy 
Delgadillo has dedicated her life to philanthropy.  During her college years she was an advocate for the Family Crisis Center in Rexburg, Idaho where she worked with her college roommate to raise funds for the center.  During this time, she also worked on public relations and graphics for the World Transformation Center which is dedicated to building schools and medical centers in Afghanistan.

From 2006 - 2008, Delgadillo worked with the Learning for Life Program in Oakland CA, where she read to inner-city youth on a weekly basis and helped them improve their reading skills.  During this time, she also volunteered with the Miss America Organization, working primarily with the Miss San Francisco and Miss California Scholarship Programs.

From 2010 to 2011, she served as Miss Houston International, during which time she volunteered with over 50 organizations throughout Houston, including: the Houston Food Bank, American Red Cross, Houston Ballet, St Judes Children Research Hospital, Ovarian Cancer Research Fund, Children's Miracle Network, and the City of Houston.

In 2011, Delgadillo is focusing on supporting Americas troops. She currently has helped to raise over $10,000 for Impact a Hero, a nonpartisan 501(c)(3) nonprofit organization geared toward helping the families of wounded soldiers. She has also chaired a tent at White Linen Night in the Heights where community members had the opportunity to sign postcards and banners for deployed military, 200 postcards were signed in just over an hour. Delgadillo puts in multiple hours of volunteer work each week contacting local celebrities and asking them to write letters and sign autographs to soldiers stationed in Afghanistan.  She is a candidate for the President's Volunteer Service Award.

Education 
In 2004, Delgadillo graduated with a Bachelor of Science Degree in Communications from Brigham Young University - Idaho with an emphasis in Public Relations, Advertising, and International Business. During her college years, she spent a summer term abroad in Europe studying Humanities and attended Deakin University - Melbourne Australia, where she studied International Marketing.

Delgadillo also attended The Academy of Art University in San Francisco, where she worked toward a Master of Fine Art in Graphic Design.

Personal life 
In 2007, Delgadillo was in Indonesia traveling with the San Francisco-based band, Scraping For Change, on the Soundrenaline tour as they climbed to the Number 1 spot on Prambors Radio Top 40 Chart above Yellowcard, Kanye West, and the Goo Goo Dolls.

Career
Delgadillo is an entrepreneur and started her first business at the age of 26.  She ran a bilingual publication focused on bridging the gap between English and Spanish speaking communities of the USA.  She currently works in the field of marketing.

References

External links 
Miss Texas International
Miss International

1982 births
Living people
Academy of Art University alumni
American beauty pageant winners
American socialites
American women philanthropists
Brigham Young University–Idaho alumni